The Heinrich-Böll-Preis is a literary prize of Germany, awarded by the City of Cologne in memory of Nobel Prize winner Heinrich Böll. The prize money is €30,000. The prize is awarded "for outstanding achievements – even by still unknown authors – in the field of German-language literature".

Recipients 

 1980 Hans Mayer
 1981 Peter Weiss
 1982 Wolfdietrich Schnurre
 1983 Uwe Johnson
 1984 Helmut Heißenbüttel
 1985 Hans Magnus Enzensberger
 1986 Elfriede Jelinek
 1987 Ludwig Harig
 1988 
 1989 Brigitte Kronauer
 1990 Günter de Bruyn
 1991 Rainald Goetz
 1992 Hans Joachim Schädlich
 1993 Alexander Kluge
 1995 Jürgen Becker
 1997 W. G. Sebald
 1999 Gerhard Meier
 2001 Marcel Beyer
 2003 Anne Duden
 2005 Ralf Rothmann
 2007 Christoph Ransmayr
 2009 Uwe Timm
 2011 Ulrich Peltzer
 2013 Eva Menasse
 2015 Herta Müller
 2017 Ilija Trojanow
 2019 Juli Zeh
 2021 José F. A. Oliver

References

External links
 

German literary awards